China Beach is an American dramatic television series set at a military evacuation hospital during the Vietnam War. The title refers to the Western nickname for My Khe beach, located on the coast of Da Nang, Vietnam. The ABC TV drama aired for four seasons over three years, from 1988 to 1991.

The show's pilot episode, "China Beach," aired on April 26, 1988. The final season was put on hiatus in fall 1990 and did not air its finale until summer 1991. The series ran for 61 episodes, concluding with a two-hour series finale on July 22, 1991. 

China Beach was released on DVD in early 2013; its release had been delayed due to expensive music rights.

Series overview

Episodes

Pilot (1988)

Season 1 (1988)

Season 2 (1988–89)

Season 3 (1989–90)

Season 4 (1990–91)

References

External links

List of China Beach episodes at TVGuide.com

China Beach